Curt Walter Joël (18 January 1865 – 15 April 1945) was a German jurist and civil servant. He was the senior civil servant in the Ministry of Justice for much of the 1920s and early 1930s, during the Weimar Republic era. Joël also served as acting Minister of Justice and in 1931/32 was a member of Heinrich Brüning's second cabinet.

Early life
Curt Walter Joël was born on 18 January 1865 at Greiffenberg, Silesia, in what was then the Kingdom of Prussia. His father, Hermann (1827–80), was a lawyer and notary there (later at Bromberg) and came from a family of Jewish merchants from Danzig. Curt Joël's mother was Else (née Pollack, 1843–90), also from a family of Jewish merchants. After her husband's death, she married Theodor Römpler in 1883, founder and head physician at the family-owned Sanatorium Görbersdorf (Waldenburg, Silesia). Curt's siblings included Eugen (1863–1911), Dr. med. and after 1902 head of the Sanatorium Görbersdorf, Arthur (b. 1866), textile merchant and manufacturer at New York, and Walter (1867–1947), president of a Finanzgericht (Fiscal Court). His cousin  (1856–1916) was founder and long-serving president of Banca Commerciale Italiana.

Curt Joël married Vally von Dressler (1880-1968) at Breslau in 1899. They had a daughter and a son, .

Early career
He studied law at Jena, Freiburg im Breisgau and Berlin. In 1908, he was promoted to Geheimer Regierungsrat and Vortragender Rat at the Reichsjustizamt (Imperial Ministry of Justice).

At the outbreak of World War I, Joël served as Landwehroffizier at the counterintelligence department of the Stellvertretender Generalstab in Berlin. From early 1915 until November 1917, he was a Hauptmann (captain), in charge of a department in occupied Belgium (known as the Generalgouvernement) and head of the Generalgouvernement's Zentralpolizeistelle (police headquarters). He also remained active in counterintelligence. In 1915, he fought determinedly, but unsuccessfully, against the execution of British citizen Edith Cavell, who had been found guilty of treason.

In October 1917, he became a Direktor at the Reichsjustizamt and subsequently was named deputy Bundesratsbevollmächtigter of Prussia (representative in the Bundesrat). In early 1918, Joël resumed work on a reform of criminal law he had previously worked on in 1908 (early draft) and since 1911 as a member of the Große Strafrechtskommission. Together with three co-workers he finished the reform draft in 1919.

Career in the Weimar Republic
By then, the Empire had been replaced with a republic but Joël continued to work at the Reichsjustizministerium (Ministry of Justice) and in early 1920 became Unterstaatssekretär (under-secretary) and on 1 April 1920 Staatssekretär. During the Kapp-Lüttwitz Putsch of March 1920, Joël organised a conference of the ministerial under-secretaries and then went to Kapp to deliver their unanimous declaration against the putschists and in favour of the legitimate government.

He competently and loyally served a total of eleven ministers and 15 cabinets, from a variety of political backgrounds. Never a member of any party himself, Joël represented the unpolitical, technocratic civil servant. He worked to keep the ministry free of party politics, which contributed to the high esteem in which the ministry was held by other ministries, state governments and the parliament. During this time he served repeatedly as acting minister of justice, first in the cabinet of chancellor Wilhelm Marx.

However, in October 1931, at that point again acting minister since 1930, Joël acceded to Brüning's request to become Minister of Justice in his second cabinet. The cabinet resigned in June 1932 and Joël then refused the offer by Franz von Papen to join its successor, since he did not want to be a party to the planned lifting of the legal ban on Sturmabteilung and Schutzstaffel, which he had earlier co-signed into law.

Joël died on 15 April 1945 in Berlin.

References

1865 births
1945 deaths
People from Lwówek Śląski County
People from the Province of Silesia
Jewish German politicians
Justice ministers of Germany
German jurists